PNAC may refer to:

Project for the New American Century, former US-based think tank
Pontifical North American College, America's Seminary in Rome
Pakistan National Accreditation Council

See also
IEEE 802.1X, an IEEE Standard for port-based Network Access Control (PNAC)